Arthur Charles Fox-Davies (28 February 1871 – 19 May 1928) was a British expert on heraldry. His Complete Guide to Heraldry, published in 1909, has become a standard work on heraldry in England. A barrister by profession, Fox-Davies worked on several notable cases involving the peerage, and also worked as a journalist and novelist.

Biography

Arthur Charles Davies (known as Charlie) was born in Bristol, the second son of Thomas Edmond Davies (1839–1908) and his wife Maria Jane Fox, the daughter and co-heiress of alderman John Fox, JP. Fox-Davies was brought up from the early 1880s at Coalbrookdale in Shropshire, where his father worked for the Coalbrookdale Iron Company and had a house called "Paradise" which became his home in much of his adult life; his grandfather, Charles Davies of Cardigan in Wales, had been an ironmonger. He added his mother's maiden name to his own by deed poll on his nineteenth birthday in 1890, thereby changing his surname from Davies to Fox-Davies. In 1894, his father took the same course for himself and the rest of the family.

Fox-Davies attended Ackworth School in Yorkshire, but was expelled in 1884 at the age of fourteen, after hitting one of the schoolmasters. He received no further formal education, but was admitted to Lincoln's Inn in 1901 and called to the bar in 1906. As a barrister, he practised on the South Eastern Circuit, at the Old Bailey, and at the Surrey and South London Sessions. He also prepared printed cases for peerage cases in the House of Lords.

He married in 1901 Mary Ellen Blanche Crookes (1870–1935), daughter and coheiress of Septimus Wilkinson Crookes and Anne Blanche Harriet Proctor. They had a son, Harley Edmond Fitzroy Fox-Davies (1907–1941), and a daughter, Moyra de Somery Regan. His wife worked as an heraldic artist, often for her husband's publications, under the pseudonym "C. Helard".

Neither the Fox nor the Davies families were armigerous, so in 1905, when Fox-Davies was 34 and already well-advanced in his career as a writer on heraldic and genealogical subjects, he organised posthumous grants of arms to both his grandfathers. The arms granted to Charles Davies were sable, a demi sun in splendour issuant in base or, a chief dancetée of the last, with, for crest, "a demi dragon rampant gules collared or, holding in the dexter claw a hammer proper"; those granted to John Fox were "per pale argent and gules, three foxes sejant counterchanged", with, for crest, a demi stag winged gules collared argent.

Fox-Davies bore the Davies arms with a crescent for cadency, and intended to quarter them with the Fox arms after his mother's death; but as she outlived him, dying in 1937, this was not possible. He also considered obtaining grants to his wife's families of Crookes and Proctor, which would have entitled his children to additional quarterings, but at this point he no longer had the money for further grants of arms. He did obtain, in 1921, the grant of a badge, which consisted of a crown vallary gules. His motto was Da Fydd, Welsh for "good faith" and a pun on the name Davies.

In addition to his writings on heraldry, he published a number of works of fiction, including detective stories such as The Dangerville Inheritance (1907), The Mauleverer Murders (1907) and The Duplicate Death (1910). He authored the article on "Heraldry" in the Catholic Encyclopedia.

Politically Conservative, Fox-Davies "quite hopelessly" stood for election as a member of parliament for Merthyr Tydfil in 1910, 1923 and 1924. He was, however, elected as a member of Holborn Borough Council in London.

Fox-Davies lived at 65 Warwick Gardens in Kensington, London, and had chambers at 23, Old Buildings, Lincoln's Inn. He died, aged 57, of portal hypertension and cirrhosis of the liver, having lain ill in his home for several weeks. He was buried at the parish church of Holy Trinity in Coalbrookdale.

Heraldic writings

Fox-Davies's writing on heraldry is characterised by a passionate attachment to heraldry as art and history and also as law. He was something of a polemicist, and issued one of his most controversial works, The Right to Bear Arms, under the pseudonym X. However, he always supported his arguments with specific historical and manuscript evidence.

He was the editor of the Genealogical Magazine from 1895 to 1906.

He conducted a lifelong campaign against the bearing of coats of arms without lawful authority in accordance with the Law of Arms, whether that authority was a right recognised at the visitations conducted by heralds between the 16th to 18th centuries or, more commonly, a right deriving from a specific grant entered in the records of the College of Arms. In support of this campaign, he produced a directory which attempted to list all living bearers of arms in England and Wales who could prove such authority, under the title Armorial Families. This served as an incentive to families who had not got such authority to regularise their position at the College of Arms and the size of the work increased considerably until its final edition in 1929, which remains the most comprehensive published record (the records of the College of Arms being largely unpublished) of post-Victorian heraldry in Britain. Many of the arms were illustrated with specially commissioned heraldic drawings, and Fox-Davies drew on this large resource when illustrating his more systematic treatises on heraldry.

The most lavish of these was The Art of Heraldry: An Encyclopædia of Armory, which was originally conceived as an English translation of a German publication (Ströhl's Heraldischer Atlas) but which was transformed, in Fox-Davies's hands, into a largely original work specifically directed to the history, theory and practice of English heraldry, with illustrations in black and white and in colour throughout. This large 500-page book was first published in 1904 and was re-issued in black and white only in 1976 by an American publisher and in 1986 in colour by a London publisher. Much of the material in this book was re-used in a shorter, cheaper and more popular exposition of contemporary English heraldic practice, A Complete Guide to Heraldry, which proved very successful and influential. This too has been reprinted several times. Even the still shorter Heraldry Explained balanced a clear and didactic text with plentiful illustration.

Fox-Davies's emphasis on practical and officially authorised heraldry caused him to showcase mostly recent grants of arms. This was in contrast to the medieval emphasis of other scholars, of whom his most prominent critics were Oswald Barron, author of the celebrated article on heraldry in the 1911 edition of the Encyclopædia Britannica, and Horace Round.

Round, in an essay called "Heraldry and the Gent" (eventually published in his collection Peerage and Pedigree), ridiculed another thesis with which Fox-Davies was particularly associated, namely, that an English grant of arms was equivalent to a continental patent of nobility, and that, not only were all English armigers to that extent noblemen as well as gentlemen (if male), but that no one without an official right to bear a coat of arms could claim to be a gentleman at all.

Fox-Davies's influence on English heraldry continued long after his death in 1928, not least because of his lawyerly insistence on backing his opinions with solid evidence, and because of the continuing popularity of his books with the general public and with expert heraldists alike. One of his admirers in the next generation was John Brooke-Little, Norroy and Ulster King of Arms and founder of the Heraldry Society, who edited a new edition of The Complete Guide to Heraldry and in many ways propagated similar, albeit somewhat less aggressively expressed, ideas.

Fox-Davies never served as a herald or pursuivant at the College of Arms, but he was one of the 250 Gold Staff Officers who assisted at the coronation of King George V.

Publications
 Dod's Peerage (editor)
 Burke's Landed Gentry (editor)
 Genealogical Magazine (editor)
 Armorial Families: volume 1 & 2 (seventh edition, 1929)
 The Book of Public Arms: a Complete Encyclopædia of all Royal, Territorial, Municipal, Corporate, Official, and Impersonal Arms (1915)
 The Art of Heraldry: An Encyclopædia of Armory
 The Law concerning Names and Changes of Name
 Heraldic Badges
 Heraldry Explained (a shortened version of The Art of Heraldry: An Encyclopædia of Armory)
 The Complete Guide to Heraldry (a shorter version of The Art of Heraldry: An Encyclopædia of Armory)
 The Right to Bear Arms (published under the pseudonym "X")
 Their Majesties' Court
 The Dangerville Inheritance
 The Average Man
 The Mauleverer Murders
 The Finances of Sir John Kynnersley
 The Sex Triumphant
 The Troubles of Colonel Marwood
 The Duplicate Death
 The Testament of John Hastings
 The Ultimate Conclusion
 The Book of Public Speaking

See also

References

Citations

General sources 

 "Fox-Davies, A. C.", in Who Was Who s.v.
 Lattimore, Colin, The Bookplates of Miss C. Helard (London: The Bookplate Society, 2012), which includes a detailed biography and profile of Fox-Davies in Section 2, and Fox-Davies's own unpublished biographical notes about himself and his family in Appendix 3.

External links

 
 

1871 births
1928 deaths
British heraldists
English genealogists
Members of Holborn Metropolitan Borough Council
Members of the Inner Temple
British male writers
Contributors to the Catholic Encyclopedia
Conservative Party (UK) parliamentary candidates
Male non-fiction writers